Electric Dusk is the debut EP by Canadian rock band Gloryhound. The album was initially recorded by the band and issued as a self-release in 2010. The EP was later remixed, remastered and rereleased across Canada after Gloryhound was signed to eOne Music Canada.

Track listing
"TKO Tokyo" – 3:30
"Electric Dusk" – 3:21
"Cruel Little Tease" – 3:49
"Yes You Are" – 3:56
"Fever Stricken Night" – 3:54
"Hung Up" – 3:44
"Keep A Light On You" – 2:59

Personnel
Evan Meisner – vocals, rhythm guitar, piano
David Casey – lead guitar, vocals
Shaun Hanlon – drums, percussion
Jeremy MacPherson – bass guitar
Laurence Currie – production, mixing 
Dean Marino – assistant engineer
Jay Sadlowski – assistant engineer
Noah Mintz (at Sterling Sound) – mastering
Nathan Quinn – A&R

Singles

Awards and nominations

Song placement

Film and television
 "TKO Tokyo" featured in Less Than Kind season 4 on HBO Canada
 "Electric Dusk featured in the film Love Me (2013)
 "Keep a Light on You" featured in Global TV Rookie Blue season 4
 "Cruel Little Tease" opened Charlie Zone dir. by Michael Melski (2011)

Sports
 "Electric Dusk" featured on Plays of the Week on NHL network (2011)
 TKO Tokyo" featured on CFL plays of the week (2012)

References

2012 EPs